Yengkhom is a Meetei Manipuri surname or family name which has Indian origin. People of this family mainly inhabit in Manipur, India.

Their mythical progenitor was Thamanglang.

References 

Meitei surnames
Pages with unreviewed translations